Qashqa Bolagh ( or ) may refer to:
 Qashqa Bolagh, Qom ( – Qāshqā Bolāgh)
 Qashqa Bolagh, West Azerbaijan ( – Qashqā Bolāgh)
 Qashqa Bolagh-e Sofla, West Azerbaijan Province